Oliva oliva is a species of sea snail, a marine gastropod mollusc of the family Olividae, the olive snails. 

This is the type species of the genus Oliva.

Subspecies Oliva oliva longispira Bridgman, 1906

Description
Fossils of the genus Oliva are common from the Eocene Epoch (57.8 to 36.6 million years ago) to the present. The shell, which is distinctive and easily recognizable, has a pointed apex and rapidly expands outward to the main body whorl. It is oval in shape, with a long and narrow aperture, and possesses an agatelike sheen and fine markings. Folds are developed on the end of the body whorl in a characteristic pattern.

Olives burrow in sandy bottoms. Common in southeastern American waters is the lettered olive(Oliva sayana), about 6 cm (2.5 inches) long. Abundant in the Indo-Pacific region is the 8-centimetre (3-inch) orange-mouthed olive (O. sericea).

Distribution
This marine species has a wide distribution and occurs from Southeast India into the Pacific

References

 Orr J. (1985). Hong Kong seashells. The Urban Council, Hong Kong
 Liu, J.Y. [Ruiyu] (ed.). (2008). Checklist of marine biota of China seas. China Science Press. 1267 pp.
 Steyn, D.G & Lussi, M. (2005). Offshore Shells of Southern Africa: A pictorial guide to more than 750 Gastropods. Published by the authors. Pp. i–vi, 1–289

External links
 Linnaeus, C. (1758). Systema Naturae per regna tria naturae, secundum classes, ordines, genera, species, cum characteribus, differentiis, synonymis, locis. Editio decima, reformata [10th revised edition, vol. 1: 824 pp. Laurentius Salvius: Holmiae]
 Röding, P.F. (1798). Museum Boltenianum sive Catalogus cimeliorum e tribus regnis naturæ quæ olim collegerat Joa. Fried Bolten, M. D. p. d. per XL. annos proto physicus Hamburgensis. Pars secunda continens Conchylia sive Testacea univalvia, bivalvia & multivalvia. Trapp, Hamburg. viii, 199 pp
 Duclos, P. L. (1835-1840). Histoire naturelle générale et particulière de tous les genres de coquilles univalves marines a l'état vivant et fossile publiée par monographie. Genre Olive. Paris: Institut de France. 33 plates: pls 1-12
 Reeve, L. A. (1850). Monograph of the genus Oliva. In: Conchologia Iconica, or, illustrations of the shells of molluscous animals, vol. 6, pl. 1-30 and unpaginated text. L. Reeve & Co., London
 Ducros de Saint Germain A. M. P. (1857). Revue critique du genre Oliva de Bruguières. 120 pp.

oliva
Gastropods described in 1758
Taxa named by Carl Linnaeus